Eureka Island is an island on the Ohio River in Pleasants County, West Virginia southwest of the city of Belmont and Broadback Island. It's named for the nearby West Virginia community of Eureka. The island is a part of the Ohio River Islands National Wildlife Refuge.

See also 
List of islands of West Virginia

River islands of West Virginia
Islands of Pleasants County, West Virginia
Islands of the Ohio River